Rychard Karpov (8 August 1931 – 2 April 2012) was a Ukrainian boxer. He competed in the men's light middleweight event at the 1956 Summer Olympics.

References

1931 births
2012 deaths
Ukrainian male boxers
Olympic boxers of the Soviet Union
Boxers at the 1956 Summer Olympics
People from Yevpatoria
Light-middleweight boxers